Kingsclear is a civil parish in York County, New Brunswick, Canada.

For governance purposes it is divided between the city of Fredericton, the Indian reserve of Kingsclear 6, the incorporated rural community of Hanwell, and the local service district of the parish of Kingsclear, all of which except the Indian reserve are members of Regional Service Commission 11 (RSC11). The LSD includes the special service area of Oswald Gray.

Origin of name
The parish's name may be a shortening of King's Clearing, a reference to early clearing of forests in the area.

History
Kingsclear was erected in 1786 as one of the county's original parishes. The parish ran twelve miles back into the country and included the islands in front of it in the Saint John River.

In 1845 Madam Keswick Island (Keswick Island and Mitchells Island) was transferred to Douglas Parish.

In 1850 the area behind Fredericton was included in the newly erected New Maryland Parish; Merrithews Island (Upper and Lower Shores Islands) was transferred to Douglas; and Kingsclear was extended back to the Charlotte County line.

In 1855 the rear of Kingsclear was included in the newly erected Manners Sutton Parish.

In 1867 Nevers Island and part of Sugar Island were transferred to Douglas.

In 1869 the 1867 changes were repealed.

In 1903 the 1867 changes were reinstituted.

In 1973 Nevers Island was returned to Kingsclear.

Boundaries
Kingsclear Parish is bounded:

 on the north by the Saint John River;
 on the southeast by a line beginning on the Saint John River about 2.4 kilometres upstream of the Westmorland Street bridge and slightly downstream of Riverside Court, then running south-southwesterly along the prolongation of the western line of the University of New Brunswick Game Refuge and the Refuge itself to the rear line of Fredericton, then running southwesterly about 23 kilometres along the New Maryland Parish-Hanwell boundary to the northeastern line of Manners Sutton Parish;
on the southwest by a line running north 45º west, along the rear line of Hanwell and the southeastern line a grant to James Taylor on the western side of Route 640, to a point about 1.25 kilometres past Jewetts Creek;
 on the northwest by the prolongation of the northwestern line of the New Market Settlement Grants, which run along Route 3 east of Kings Landing, striking the Saint John River on the eastern side of Wheeler Cove;
 including all islands in the Saint John River in front of the parish except Upper Shores, Lower Shores, Mitchells, Merrithews, and Keswick, and part of Sugar Island roughly north and west of the Baseline Road.

Communities
Communities at least partly within the parish. bold indicates an incorporated municipality, incorporated rural community or Indian reserve

 Central Kingsclear
 Fredericton
 Garden Creek
 Springhill
 French Village
  Hanwell
 Somerset Park
 Starlite Village
 Island View
  Kingsclear
 Kingsclear 6
 Longs Creek
 Mazerolle Settlement
 Newmarket
 Oswald Gray
 Smithfield
 Yoho

Bodies of water
Bodies of water at least partly within the parish.

  Saint John River
 Glooscap Reach
 Grand Pass
 Scoodawakscook Bend
 Nasonworth Millstream
 South Branch Rusagonis Stream
 Currier Creek
 Garden Creek
 Kellys Creek
 Kellys Creek Basin
 Longs Creek
 Longs Creek Arm
 Shin Creek
  Mactaquac Lake
 Murray Lake
 Tower Lake
 Yoho Lake

Islands
Islands at least partly within the parish. italics indicate a name no longer in official use

 Burpee Island
 Clements Island
 Currie Island
 Dunphy Island
 Eqpahak (Savage Island)
 Hartts Island
 Jewett Island
 McGibbon Island
 Murray Island
 Nevers Island
 Parsnip Island
 Pitt Island
 Ross Island
 Sugar Island

Other notable places
Parks, historic sites, and other noteworthy places at least partly within the parish.
 Mactaquac Dam
 University of New Brunswick Wildlife Refuge
 Woolastook Provincial Park

Demographics
Parish population total does not include  Hanwell, Kingsclear 6 Indian reserve, and portion within Fredericton

Population
Population trend

"2011 revised" reflects the result after the creation of the Rural Community of Hanwell

Language
Mother tongue language (2006)

See also
List of parishes in New Brunswick

Notes

References

External links
 City of Fredericton
 Hanwell Rural Community
 Kingsclear Local Service District
 Upper Kingsclear community
 York Rural Community Project

Parishes of York County, New Brunswick
Greater Fredericton
Local service districts of York County, New Brunswick